Temora is a genus of copepods in the family Temoridae. The World Register of Marine Species lists the following species:

Temora discaudata Giesbrecht, 1889
Temora kerguelensis Wolfenden, 1911
Temora longicornis (Müller O.F., 1785)
Temora stylifera (Dana, 1849)
Temora turbinata (Dana, 1849)

Additionally, Temora curta (Dana, 1849) is considered a taxon inquirendum.

Species brought into synonymy 
A number of species previously included in this genus have been moved to the Eurytemora genus:

 Temora affinis Poppe, 1880 and Temora inermis Boeck, 1865 (now Eurytemora affinis affinis Poppe, 1880)
 Temora clausii Hoek, 1878 and Temora velox Lilljeborg, 1853 (now Eurytemora velox (Lilljeborg, 1853))

References

Temoridae
Taxonomy articles created by Polbot
Copepod genera